Lamballe Terre et Mer is the communauté d'agglomération, an intercommunal structure, centred on the town of Lamballe-Armor. It is located in the Côtes-d'Armor department, in the Brittany region, northwestern France. Created in 2017, its seat is in Lamballe-Armor. Its area is 912.9 km2. Its population was 67,875 in 2019, of which 16,688 in Lamballe-Armor proper.

Composition
The communauté d'agglomération consists of the following 38 communes:

Andel
La Bouillie
Bréhand
Coëtmieux
Éréac
Erquy
Hénanbihen
Hénansal
Hénon
Jugon-les-Lacs-Commune-Nouvelle
La Malhoure
Lamballe-Armor
Landéhen
Lanrelas
Moncontour
Noyal
Penguily
Plédéliac
Plémy
Plénée-Jugon
Pléneuf-Val-André
Plestan
Plurien
Pommeret
Quessoy
Quintenic
Rouillac
Saint-Alban
Saint-Denoual
Saint-Glen
Saint-Rieul
Saint-Trimoël
Sévignac
Tramain
Trébry
Trédaniel
Trédias
Trémeur

References

Lamballe
Lamballe